The Read with Kid Fury and Crissle West is an American variety and talk show. It is a television adaptation of the pop culture podcast The Read and stars the podcast's hosts, Kid Fury and Crissle West. The series premiered on October 11, 2019 on Fuse.

Production
On March 13, 2019, it was announced that the podcast The Read would be adapted into a television show. The television show was one of several pilots released by Fuse from 2019 to 2020 that targeted diverse, millennial, and Generation Z audiences. The producers included Chloe Pisello, Jonathan Martin, Richard Allen-Turner, and Jon Thoday. Kid Fury and Crissle West served as the show's hosts and executive producers.

The show has a 30-minute run-time, and features two segments that appear on the podcast, The Read and Hot Tops. Special guests appeared on several episodes.

On August 14, 2019, it was announced that the show would premiere on October 11, 2019. The first season had ten episodes.

Broadcast
The series premiered in the United States on Fuse on October 11, 2019. It appeared weekly for 30 minutes and also streamed on iTunes and Amazon Prime.

Episodes

References

External links 
Official website

2019 American television series debuts
2010s American late-night television series
Television shows filmed in New York (state)
Fuse (TV channel) original programming
African-American television
2010s American LGBT-related television series